The Mahar Regiment is an infantry regiment of the Indian Army. Although it was originally intended to be a regiment consisting of troops from the Mahar community of Maharashtra, today the Mahar Regiment is composed of different communities from mainly states like Maharashtra, Gujarat, Madhya Pradesh, Uttar Pradesh, and Bihar.

History

Overview
The Mahars considered original inhabitants of Maharashtra. The community, also known as "Kathiwale" (Men with sticks), Bhumiputra (Brunei) (Sons of the Soil), Mirasi (Landlords) by tradition has the role of defending village boundaries from outsiders, invading tribes, criminals,  and thieves. They also were also responsible for maintaining law and order throughout the villages as administrators. The Mahars have a long and proud tradition of bearing arms.
	
Mahar served in various armies over several centuries. Under Islamic rule, Mahars served as soldiers in various armies of the Deccan Sultanates, Bahmani Sultanate, and the Mughals.

The Maratha king Shivaji Maharaj recruited a number of them into his army in the 17th century. They served as guards in hill forts and as soldiers. The Mahar along with the Koli and Marathas defended the fort of Purandar from Dilirkhan's Moghul army in 1665. Later during Peshwa rule Shidnak mahar saved the life of his commander Parshurambhau Patwardhan during the Battle of Kharda in 1795.

During the colonial period, large numbers of Mahars were recruited for military duties by the East India Company and the British Raj. The Battle of Koregaon (1 January 1818) is commemorated by an obelisk known as the Koregaon pillarwhich was erected at the site of the battleand by a medal issued in 1851. The pillar featured on the Mahar Regiment crest until the Independence of India; it is inscribed with the names of 22 Mahars killed at the battle. The victory pillar serves as focal point of Mahar heroism.

The Mahar began their service to the East India company around 1750. Between 20 to 25 per cent of the British Bombay Army were Mahars. Their conduct as soldiers was praised by many British officers. Mahars were a vital component of the British Marine Battalion. In the East India Company Army they participated in various wars including Second Anglo-Maratha War, Third Anglo-Maratha War, Second Anglo-Sikh War and Second Afghan War.

After the 1857 mutiny, the British decided to change their military recruitment policy. One report "emphasized that we cannot practically ignore it (the caste system), so long as the natives socially maintain it". This led to the discrimination against the Mahars, other low-caste and some unreliable Brahmin castes.

Martial races theory and disbandment
 

After the Revolt of 1857, the British officers of the Indian Army, particularly those who had served in the First and Second Afghan Wars, began to give currency to the Martial Races Theory. This theory was that some races and communities among Indians were naturally warlike, and more suited to warfare than others. A major proponent of this theory was Lord Roberts, who became Commander-in-Chief of the Indian Army in the November 1885. There was a gradual "Punjabisation" of the Indian Army to the detriment of the other communities. The final blow for the Mahar troops came in 1892, when it was decided to institute "class regiments" in the Indian Army. The Mahars were not included in these class regiments, and it was notified that the Mahars, among with some other classes, were no longer to be recruited in the Indian army. The Mahar troops, who included 104 Viceroy's Commissioned Officers and a host of Non-commissioned officers and Sepoys were demobilised. This event was regarded by the Mahars as a betrayal of their loyalty by a government they had served for over a hundred years.

Raising of the Mahar Regiment

After the demobilisation of the Mahar troops, there were many attempts by the leaders of the Mahar community to persuade the Government to let them serve in the Army once again. Petitions to this effect were drafted by ex-soldiers such as Gopal Baba Walangkar in 1894, and Shivram Janba Kamble in 1904.
These petitions were supported in principle by the politician and social reformer Gopal Krishna Gokhale, who was opposed to the Martial Races theory. They were also supported by the Indian National Congress, who were also opposed to the recruiting policies of the Army. The recruitment policies of the British Indian Army continued until the beginning of the First World War in 1914. The shortage of men forced the Government to begin more broad-based recruiting, and the Mahars were at last allowed to enlist in the Army. One battalion of Mahar troops, the 111th Mahars was raised in the June 1917. However, the battalion did not see much service during the War, and in 1920 it was merged with the 71st Punjabis. Finally, the battalion was disbanded in March 1921, and the Mahars were once again demobilised. 

World War II forced the British to broaden their recruitment and the Mahar Regiment was raised in 1941. In that year B. R. Ambedkar was appointed to the Defence Advisory Committee of the Viceroy's Executive Council.He also appealed to the Mahars to join the Army in large numbers. In October, the Army gave in, and the 1st battalion of the Mahar Regiment was raised in Belgaum under Lt. Col. H.J.R. Jackson of the 13th Frontier Force Rifles and Sub. Maj. Sheikh Hassnuddin. The 2nd battalion was raised in Kamptee in June 1942 under Lt. Col. J.W.K. Kirwan and Sub. Maj. Bholaji Ranjane. A cap badge was designed for the regiment by Capt. E.E.L. Mortlemans, an officer of the 2nd battalion. The badge featured the Koregaon Pillar over the word "Mahar". The third battalion, the 25th Mahars, was raised in Belgaum in the August 1942 by Lt. Col V. Chambier and Sub. Maj. Sardar Bahadur Ladkojirao Bhonsale, and the 3rd Mahars were raised in Nowshera by Lt. Col. R.N.D. Frier and Sub. Maj. Bholaji Ranjane. During the Second World War, the 1st and 3rd Mahars served in the North-West Frontier Province, while the 2nd and 25th were employed on internal security duties within the country. The 2nd battalion also saw service in the Burma Campaign as a part of the 23rd Indian Division, where they suffered 5 casualties and had one officer mentioned in dispatches. They also served in Iraq after the war as a part of PAIFORCE. 

In 1946, the 25th Mahars were disbanded, along with many other garrison battalions of the Indian Army. Its officers and men were largely absorbed by the other three battalions of the regiment. In the October 1946, the regiment was converted into a machine gun regiment, and the regimental centre was established at Kamptee. Following the conversion, the cap badge was changed. The new badge had two crossed Vickers machine guns over the Koregaon Pillar, over a scroll that said "The Mahar MG Regiment". The three surviving battalions of the regiment served as a part of the Punjab Boundary Force, and took part in escorting refugees during the Partition of India.

Border Scouts

The Border Scouts were an irregular force formed by the people of the border villages in East Punjab during Partition. Hailing as they did from the erstwhile greater state of East Punjab (which included the present states of Haryana and Himachal Pradesh), the force had people hailing from a greater mix of ethnic, religious and caste backgrounds than was the norm in the Indian Army. They did some useful work defending villages from attacks during partition, and as a reward, were given a more permanent character as the East Punjab Frontier Scouts in 1948. They served along the border with Pakistan as border guards, and were regarded as a useful adjunct of the Punjab Armed Police. The unit was redesignated the 1st, 2nd and 3rd Battalions of the Border Scouts in 1951, with recruitment from different North Indian communities. In 1956, the decision to convert this force into Machine-Gun Regiments was taken, and the three battalions were merged with the Mahar Regiment, the only Indian Machine Gun Regiment in existence at the time. They joined the Regiment as the 4th, 5th and 6th Battalions of the Mahar Regiment, and it is to these units that the Regiment traces its mixed-class composition. The three Battalions style themselves battalions of the Mahar Regiment (Borders) even today.

Operation Pawan

Late on 25 November 1987, when a column of the Mahar Regiment under Major Ramaswamy Parameswaran (8 Mahar) was returning from a search operation in Sri Lanka, it was ambushed by a group of militants armed with five rifles. In response, Parameswaran encircled the militants from the rear and charged into them, taking them completely surprise. In the ensuing hand-to-hand combat, a militant shot Parameswaran in the chest. Undaunted, he snatched the rifle from the militant and shot him dead. Gravely wounded, he continued to give orders and inspired his command until he died. Five militants were killed and three rifles and two rocket launchers were recovered and the ambush was cleared. Parameswaran was posthumously awarded the Param Vir Chakra, India's highest military decoration, for his bravery.

Composition

Battalions:
1st Battalion
2nd Battalion
3rd Battalion
4th Battalion (Borders)
5th Battalion (Borders)
6th Battalion (Borders)
7th Battalion
8th Battalion (Param Vir Chakra)
9th Battalion
10th Battalion
11th Battalion
12th Battalion
13th Battalion
14th Battalion (formerly 31st Mahar) & (UN Mission 2017 to 2018)
15th Battalion (formerly 32nd Mahar)
17th Battalion
18th Battalion
19th Battalion
20th Battalion  
21st Battalion
22nd Battalion

Former battalions
25th Battalion (disbanded 1946).
16th Battalion (formerly 8th Parachute Regiment) (converted to 12th Mechanised Infantry in 1981)

Allied units
108th Infantry Battalion, Territorial Army (Sagar,Madhya Pradesh)
115th Infantry Battalion, Territorial Army (based at Belgaum, Karnataka)
1st Battalion, Rashtriya Rifles
30th Battalion, Rashtriya Rifles
51st Battalion, Rashtriya Rifles

References

External links
 The Martial Races at Country-Data.com
 The Mahar Regiment, Bharat Rakshak

Infantry regiments of the Indian Army from 1947
British Indian Army infantry regiments
Units of the Indian Peace Keeping Force